Rhyme book may refer to:
 Rhyme Book, an album by rapper Scribe
 Rime dictionary, a type of dictionary in ancient China
 slang for books that musicians keep their lyrics in.